Gerard Croese (26 April 1642, Amsterdam – 10 May 1710, Dordrecht) was a Dutch Reformed minister and author. He is now remembered as an early historian of the Society of Friends, with his Historia Quakeriana (1695). It is considered sympathetic, in general terms, but neither uncritical nor entirely reliable.

Life
Croese was born in Amsterdam. He studied at Leiden University, under Johann Friedrich Gronovius, Georgius Hornius, Johannes Cocceius and Johannes Hoornbeek. After university he spent time in Smyrna, and visited England. He settled as a minister at Alblas, near Dordrecht.

Notes

1642 births
1710 deaths
17th-century Dutch Calvinist and Reformed ministers
Dutch male writers
Writers from Amsterdam